Enzo Cucchi (born 14 November 1949) is an Italian painter. A native of Morro d'Alba, province of Ancona, he was a key member of the Italian Transavanguardia movement, along with his countrymen Francesco Clemente, Mimmo Paladino, Nicola De Maria, and Sandro Chia. The movement was at its peak during the 1980s and was part of the worldwide movement of Neo-Expressionist painters.

Cucchi's first major Retrospective was held at the Solomon R. Guggenheim Museum, New York 1986 and his works are held in numerous museum collections including the Museum of Modern Art New York, the Tate London and the Art Institute of Chicago.  Cucchi lives and works in Rome and Ancona.

Biography
Enzo Cucchi was born in 1949 in Morro d‘Alba, a farming village in the province of Ancona in central Italy. As an autodidactic painter Cucchi was lauded in his early years even though he was more interested in poetry. He frequently visited poet Mino De Angelis, who was in charge of the magazine Tau. Through La Nuova Foglio di Macerata, a small publishing house, he met with art critic Achille Bonito Oliva, an important figure in the artist's prospective career. In its catalogues La Nuova Foglio di Macerata published writings of artists such as Cucchi's Il veleno è stato sollevato e trasportato! in 1976. Frequent trips to Rome in the mid-seventies revived Cucchi's interest in visual arts. He moved to Rome, temporarily abandoned poetry and dedicated himself exclusively to the visual arts. Here Cucchi met with different artists such as Sandro Chia, Francesco Clemente, Mimmo Paladino and Nicola de Maria with whom he began to work in close contact and to establish dialectical and intellectual dialogues.

Achille Bonito Oliva was the first to name this young generation of Italian artists of the seventies as a group: In Flash Art Magazine, no. 92-93, 1979, he used the term Transavanguardia for the first time. The official proclamation of the Transavanguardia took place at the  1980 Venice Biennial. The term was an idiom for the art of this young generation following the Avant-garde art of the sixties. These artists no longer sought to evoke discomfort in the spectator by all means and to force him to go beyond the work to grasp it fully.

The members of the Transavanguardia-group have diverse working methods. Their identity as a group is not dependent on rules or any binding language of expression, but they share a preference for motifs gathered from imaginable reality and the free use of past and present. Cucchi uses forms suggestive of the landscape, legends and traditions of his home-region.  He shows nature, history and culture in a playful relationship with our technical world, using symbols like a train or an ocean-liner and employing colour in terms of idea, expansion and motion rather than for pictorial sensation. His artwork is often accompanied by poetic texts some of which have been published.

Aside from the numerous Transavanguardia- group-exhibitions, his  work has been the subject of solo shows in galleries, museums and cultural sites all over the world.

Works
In the late 1970s, Cucchi's highly original work conspicuously stood out in a scene dominated by conceptual art. Art critic and dealer Mario Diacono supported him by exhibiting his work in Italy and the United States. Since 1979 Cucchi has maintained a co-operative relationship with gallery owner Emilio Mazzoli in Modena and with Bruno Bischofberger who had represented him since 1981 and since 1995 exclusively worldwide. Between 1981 and 1985 also Gian Enzo Sperone frequently exhibited Cucchi's work in his galleries in Rome and New York. Consequently, his experimental expressionist style gradually became influential whereas he set out to expand the material qualities in his art by painting or drawing directly on walls, using ceramics, mosaic or painted images as a part of sculpture and by creating free installation spaces.

Cucchi's varied interests have led him beyond the bounds of ordinary exhibitions. He has made outdoor sculptures for the Brueglinger Park in Basel in 1984, and the Louisiana Museum of Modern Art in Humblebaek, Denmark in 1985, a fountain for the garden of the Museo d’arte contemporanea Luigi Pecci in Prato in 1988 and the Fontana d‘Italia at York University in Toronto. And a fountain in the center square of his home town, Morro d'Alba.

He also contributed to the Lucio Amelio's contemporary art collection in the Royal Palace of Caserta. The Neapolitan gallerist, after the Irpinia earthquake of 1980, asked to the major artists of that time a work about the earthquake in order to get through that terrible experience; his work Senza titolo consists in four rusty iron panels, which symbolizes the violence of the passing of time, with a vessel in the middle, a precariousness image typical of his art.

Between 1992 and 1994 he collaborated with architect Mario Botta on the chapel built on Monte Tamaro near Lugano, Switzerland, where Cucchi assisted with designing the interior of the chapel, mainly the main altar and the executed murals for the apse and nave. Cucchi enjoys close relationships with poets and writers like Paolo Volponi, Goffredo Parise, Giovanni Testori, Ruggero Guarini, Alberto Boatto and Paul Evangelisti. He has made illustrations for their books while they have written on his art.
Cucchi has also been active in the field of stage design: He has designed costumes and sets for productions such as Rossini‘s and Respighi‘s La Bottega Fantastica at the Rossini Opera Festival in Pesaro and Heinrich von Kleist’s Penthesilea, both in 1986, Puccini‘s Tosca at the Teatro dell‘Opera in Rome, from 1990–1991, Pennisi‘s Funeral of the Moon in Gibellina, in 1991 and an adaptation of Erasmus‘ In Praise of Folly, in 1992. In 1996 he designed the curtain for the Teatro la Fenice in Senigallia and a mosaic on the sidewalk in front of La Rotonda al Mare".

Selected exhibitions
FL - Wizard Gallery, Milano 2014
BIASA ArtSpace, Seminyak, Bali, Indonesia, 2010
EMMA, Espoon Kaupunki, Finland, 2009
Museo Correr, Venezia, 2007
Academie de France à Rome, Villa Medici, Roma, 2006
Artium, Centro Museo Vasco de Arte Contemporaneo in Vitoria-Gasteiz, España, 2002
Mosaico nella Stazione Termini, Roma, 2000
Tel Aviv Museum of Art, Tel Aviv, 1999 and 2001
Deichtorhallen Hamburg, Hamburg, 1999
Artiscope Gallery, Brussels, 1999
Suermondt-Ludwig-Museum, Aachen, 1997
Museo di Capodimonte, Napoli, 1996
Sezon Museum of Art, Tokyo, 1996
Museo di Palazzo Reale Arengario, Milano 1995
Collezione "Terrae Motus", Reggia di Caserta, 1994
Castello di Rivoli Museo d’Arte Contemporanea, Turino 1993
 Artiscope Gallery, Brussels, 1993
Museo Cantonale d'Arte, Lugano, 1993
Hamburger Kunsthalle, Hamburg, 1992
Carré d‘Art, Musée d‘Art Contemporain, Nîmes, 1991
Fundació Joan Miró, Barcelona, 1991
Wiener Secession, Wien, 1988
Städtische Galerie im Lenbachhaus, München 1987
Musée d’art moderne Centre Georges Pompidou, Paris 1986
The Solomon R. Guggenheim Museum, New York 1986
Fundación Caja de Pensiones, Madrid; capc Musée d‘Art contemporain, Bordeaux, 1985
Louisiana Museum of Modern Art, Humblebaek, 1985
Stedelijk Museum, Amsterdam, 1983
Kunsthaus Zürich, 1982, 1984 and 1988
Documenta 7, Kassel, 1982
Gallery Gian Enzo Sperone, Roma, 1981
Galerie Bruno Bischofberger, Zürich, 1981
Incontri Internazionali d‘Arte, Roma, 1977

Bibliography

References

External links
Artist page at artnet.com
  Enzo Cucchi

1949 births
Living people
People from the Province of Ancona
20th-century Italian painters
21st-century Italian painters
Italian male painters
Italian contemporary artists
Contemporary painters
Postmodern artists
Transavanguardia
20th-century Italian male artists
21st-century Italian male artists
Neo-expressionist artists